A cafeteria, sometimes called a canteen outside the U.S. and Canada, is a type of food service location in which there is little or no waiting staff table service, whether a restaurant or within an institution such as a large office building or school; a school dining location is also referred to as a dining hall or lunchroom (in American English). Cafeterias are different from coffeehouses, although the English term came from the Spanish cafetería, same meaning.

Instead of table service, there are food-serving counters/stalls or booths, either in a line or allowing arbitrary walking paths. Customers take the food that they desire as they walk along, placing it on a tray. In addition, there are often stations where customers order food, particularly  items such as hamburgers or tacos which must be served hot and can be immediately prepared with little waiting. Alternatively, the patron is given a number and the item is brought to their table. For some food items and drinks, such as sodas, water, or the like, customers collect an empty container, pay at the check-out, and fill the container after the check-out. Free unlimited second servings are often allowed under this system. For legal purposes (and the consumption patterns of customers), this system is rarely, if at all, used for alcoholic drinks in the United States.

Customers are either charged a flat rate for admission (as in a buffet) or pay at the check-out for each item.  Some self-service cafeterias charge by the weight of items on a patron's plate. In universities and colleges, some students pay for three meals a day by making a single large payment for the entire semester.

As cafeterias require few employees, they are often found within a larger institution, catering to the employees or clientele of that institution. For example, schools, colleges and their residence halls, department stores, hospitals, museums, places of worship, amusement parks, military bases, prisons, factories and office buildings often have cafeterias. Although some of such institutions self-operate their cafeterias, many outsource their cafeterias to a food service management company or lease space to independent businesses to operate food service facilities. The three largest food service management companies servicing institutions are Aramark, Compass Group, and Sodexo.

At one time, upscale cafeteria-style restaurants dominated the culture of the Southern United States, and to a lesser extent the Midwest. There were numerous prominent chains of them: Bickford's, Morrison's Cafeteria, Piccadilly Cafeteria, S&W Cafeteria, Apple House, Luby's, K&W, Britling, Wyatt's Cafeteria and Blue Boar among them. Currently, two Midwestern chains still exist, Sloppy Jo's Lunchroom and Manny's, which are both located in Illinois. There were also a number of smaller chains, usually located in and around a single city. These institutions, with the exception of K&W, went into a decline in the 1960s with the rise of fast food and were largely finished off in the 1980s by the rise of all-you-can-eat buffets and other casual dining establishments. A few chains—particularly Luby's and Piccadilly Cafeterias (which took over the Morrison's chain in 1998)—continue to fill some of the gap left by the decline of the older chains. Some of the smaller Midwestern chains, such as MCL Cafeterias centered on Indianapolis, are still in business.

History

Perhaps the first self-service restaurant (not necessarily a cafeteria) in the U.S. was the Exchange Buffet in New York City, opened September 4, 1885, which catered to an exclusively male clientele. Food was purchased at a counter and patrons ate standing up.  This represents the predecessor of two formats: the cafeteria, described below and the automat.

During the 1893 World's Columbian Exposition in Chicago, entrepreneur John Kruger built an American version of the smörgåsbords he had seen while traveling in Sweden. Emphasising the simplicity and light fare, he called it the 'Cafeteria' - Spanish for 'coffee shop'.  The exposition attracted over 27 million visitors (half the U.S. population at the time) in six months, and it was because of Kruger's operation that the United States first heard the term and experienced the self-service dining format.

Meanwhile, in mid-scale United States, the chain of Childs Restaurants quickly grew from about 10 locations in New York City in 1890 to hundreds across the U.S. and Canada by 1920.  Childs is credited with the innovation of adding trays and a "tray line" to the self-service format, introduced in 1898 at their 130 Broadway location.  Childs did not change its format of sit-down dining, however. This was soon the standard design for most Childs Restaurants, and many ultimately the dominant design for cafeterias.

It has been conjectured that the 'cafeteria craze' started in May 1905, when Helen Mosher opened a downtown L.A. restaurant where people chose their food at a long counter and carried their trays to their tables.  California has a long history in the cafeteria format - notably the Boos Brothers Cafeterias, and the Clifton's and Schaber's. The earliest cafeterias in California were opened at least 12 years after Kruger's Cafeteria, and Childs already had many locations around the country. Horn & Hardart, an automat format chain (different from cafeterias), was well established in the mid-Atlantic region before 1900.

Between 1960 and 1981, the popularity of cafeterias was overcome by the fast food restaurant and fast casual restaurant formats.

Outside the United States, the development of cafeterias can be observed in France as early as 1881 with the passing of the Ferry Law. This law mandated that public school education be available to all children. Accordingly, the government also encouraged schools to provide meals for students in need, thus resulting in the conception of cafeterias or cantine (in French). According to Abramson, prior to the creation of cafeterias, only some students were able to bring home-cooked meals and able to be properly fed in schools.

As cafeterias in France became more popular, their use spread beyond schools and into the workforce. Thus, due to pressure from workers and eventually new labor laws, sizable businesses had to, at minimum, provide established eating areas for its workers. Support for this practice was also reinforced by the effects of  World War II when the importance of national health and nutrition came under great attention.

Other names

A cafeteria in a U.S. military installation is known as a chow hall, a mess hall, a galley, mess decks or, more formally, a dining facility, often abbreviated to DFAC, whereas in common British Armed Forces parlance, it is known as a cookhouse or mess. Students in the United States often refer to cafeterias as lunchrooms, which also often serve school breakfast. Some school cafeterias in the U.S. and Canada have stages and movable seating that allow use as auditoriums. These rooms are known as cafetoriums or All Purpose Rooms. In some older facilities, a school's gymnasium is also often used as a cafeteria, with the kitchen facility being hidden behind a rolling partition outside non-meal hours. Newer rooms which also act as the school's grand entrance hall for crowd control and are used for multiple purposes, are often called the commons.

Cafeterias serving university dormitories are sometimes called dining halls or dining commons.  A food court is a type of cafeteria found in many shopping malls and airports featuring multiple food vendors or concessions, although a food court could equally be styled as a type of restaurant as well, being more aligned with public, rather than institutionalised, dining. Some institutions, especially schools, have food courts with stations offering different types of food served by the institution itself (self-operation) or a single contract management company, rather than leasing space to numerous businesses.
Some monasteries, boarding schools, and older universities refer to their cafeteria as a refectory. Modern-day British cathedrals and abbeys, notably in the Church of England, often use the phrase refectory to describe a cafeteria open to the public. Historically, the refectory was generally only used by monks and priests. For example, although the original 800-year-old refectory at Gloucester Cathedral (the stage setting for dining scenes in the Harry Potter movies) is now mostly used as a choir practice area, the relatively modern 300-year-old extension, now used as a cafeteria by staff and public alike, is today referred to as the refectory.

A cafeteria located within a movie or TV studio complex is often called a commissary.

College cafeteria

In American English, a college cafeteria is a cafeteria intended for college students. In British English it is often called the refectory. These cafeterias can be a part of a residence hall or in a separate building. Many of these colleges employ their own students to work in the cafeteria. The number of meals served to students varies from school to school, but is normally around 21 meals per week. Like normal cafeterias, a person will have a tray to select the food that they want, but (at some campuses) instead of paying money, pays beforehand by purchasing a meal plan.

The method of payment for college cafeterias is commonly in the form of a meal plan, whereby the patron pays a certain amount at the start of the semester and details of the plan are stored on a computer system.  Student ID cards are then used to access the meal plan. Meal plans can vary widely in their details and are often not necessary to eat at a college cafeteria. Typically, the college tracks students' usage of their plan by counting the number of predefined meal servings, points, dollars or number of buffet dinners.  The plan may give the student a certain number of any of the above per week or semester and they may or may not roll over to the next week or semester.

Many schools offer several different options for using their meal plans.  The main cafeteria is usually where most of the meal plan is used but smaller cafeterias, cafés, restaurants, bars or even fast food chains located on campus, on nearby streets, or in the surrounding town or city may accept meal plans.  A college cafeteria system often has a virtual monopoly on the students due to an isolated location or a requirement that residence contracts include a full meal plan.

Taiwanese cafeteria
There are many self-service Bento shops in Taiwan.
The store will put the dishes in the self-service area for the customers to pick up by themselves. After the customers choose, they will go to the cashier to check out; many stores will use the staff to visually check the amount of food when assessing the price, and some stores will use the method of weighing.

See also
 Automat
 Coffee service
 Coffeehouse
 Food court
 Hawker centre
 List of cafeterias
 Mess
 Refectory

References

Rooms
Restaurants by type